Stephen Bryant is an English violinist, best known as the leader of the BBC Symphony Orchestra.

Biography
Stephen has led all the British orchestras as well as performed as a soloist. He has taken part in more than hundred commercial recordings.

Albums

As violinist
Symphonic Stories (2012)	
Virtues (2010)	
Born To the Breed: A Tribute to Judy Collins (2008)
Mono In VCF (2008)
Truth in Sincerity (2007)
The Golden Age of Hollywood (2003)	
A Life in Reverse: The Music of Minna Keal (1999)
Atlantis (1991)
B.C. (1979)
Handy Dandy Man (1978)

As Concertmaster 

 Wagner  - The Ride of the Valkyries and various /  2002 Classics for Pleasure / London Philharmonic
 Stravinsky – The Rite of Spring / 1999 Classics for Pleasure / London Philharmonic
 Mozart – Requiem / Mass in C Minor / 2002 Classics for Pleasure / London Philharmonic
 Busoni – Orchestral Suite No 2 / 2002 Chandos / BBC Philharmonic
 ‘A String Around Autumn’  / 2002 Bis / BBC National Orchestra of Wales
 ‘Best of British’ from the BBC Proms 2007 / 2007 Deutsch Grammophon / BBC Symphony Orchestra
 Judith Weir – The Welcome Arrival of Rain / 2008 NMC / BBC Symphony Orchestra
 Scottish Fantasies for Violin and Orchestra / 2005 CEDIZLE / Scottish Chamber Orchestra
 ‘Perfect Day’ (BBC Children in Need)(Single) / 1997 Chrysalis / BBC Symphony Orchestra
 Gerhard – Symphony / Harpsichord Concerto / 1999 Chandos /  BBC Symphony Orchestra
 L’Enfant et les Sortileges / L’Heure Espagnole (DVD) / 2009 / London Philharmonic
 Camilo – Concerto for Piano and Orchestra / 2001 Decca / BBC Symphony Orchestra
 Walton – Symphony No 1 and Takemitsu / 1993 BBC Music Magazine CD / BBC Symphony Orchestra
 Bach – The Conductors’ Transcriptions / 2004 Chandos /  BBC Symphony Orchestra
 Elgar – Symphony No2, Serenade / 1989 RCA Victor Red Seal / London Philharmonic
 Rakhmaninov – Symphony No 2, Vocalise / 1992 Nimbus Records / BBC National Orchestra of Wales
 Rakhmaninov – Orchestral Works / 1998 Nimbus Records /  BBC National Orchestra of Wales
 Rimsky-Korsakov – Scheherazade / 2005 Classics for Pleasure / London Philharmonic
 ‘Joie de Vivre’ / 2005 Decca /  BBC Symphony Orchestra
 Tippett Conducts Tippett Symphonies 2 and 4 / 1993 BBC Music Magazine CD /  BBC Symphony Orchestra
 Shostakovich – Daniel Hope / 2006 Warner Classics /  BBC Symphony Orchestra
 Bantock – Omar Khayyam / 2007 Chandos /  BBC Symphony Orchestra
 ‘The Last Night of the Proms 2003’ / 2004 Warner Classics /  BBC Symphony Orchestra
 Mendelssohn – Violin Concerto, Symphony No 3 / 2002 Linn Records / Scottish Chamber Orchestra
 Rimsky-Korsakov – Scheherazade / 1990 EMI Eminence / London Philharmonic
 Foulds – A World Requiem / 2008 Chandos /  BBC Symphony Orchestra
 Joel – Francois Durand – La Terre et Le Feu / 2004 Mode /  BBC Symphony Orchestra
 John Corigliano, Zhou Long / 2005 Warner Classics /  BBC Symphony Orchestra
 Bax – Symphony No 6, Festival Overture / 1988 Chandos / London Philharmonic
 Berlioz – Symphonie Fantastique / 1993 BBC Music Magazine CD /  BBC Symphony Orchestra
 Janacek – The Excursions of Mr Broucek / 2008 Deutsch Grammophon /  BBC Symphony Orchestra
 Susan Graham – Poemes De L’Amour / 2005 Warner Classics /  BBC Symphony Orchestra
 The Grainger Edition, Volume 1 / 1996 Chandos / BBC Philharmonic 
 Chausson – Le Roi Arthus / 2005 Telarc /  BBC Symphony Orchestra
 John Veale , Benjamin Britten – Violin Concertos / 2001 Chandos /  BBC Symphony Orchestra
 Medtner – Piano Concerto No 1 in C Minor / 1994 Hyperion /  BBC Symphony Orchestra
 Malcolm Arnold – Vernon Handley / 2006 LPO Recording / London Philharmonic
 Bax – Orchestral Works Volume 5 / 2003 Chandos /  BBC Symphony Orchestra
 Marx – Orchestral Songs and Choral Works / 2009 Chandos /  BBC Symphony Orchestra
 Nikos Skalkottas – 36 Greek Dances, The Return of Ulysses / 2002 Bis /  BBC Symphony Orchestra
 Martinu – The 6 Symphonies / 2010 Onyx Classics-BBC  /  BBC Symphony Orchestra
 Elgar – Dream of Gerontius, Sea Pictures / 2014 Chandos /  BBC Symphony Orchestra
 Delius – Concertos / 2011 Chandos /  BBC Symphony Orchestra
 Szymanowski – Stabat Mater, Harnasie / 2013 Chandos /  BBC Symphony Orchestra
 Szymanowski – Symphony No 2 and 4 / 2013 Chandos /  BBC Symphony Orchestra
 Suk – Summer’s Tale, Prague / 2012 Chandos /  BBC Symphony Orchestra
 Walton – Symphony No 1 / 2014 Chandos /  BBC Symphony Orchestra
 British Clarinet Concertos / 2012 Chandos /  BBC Symphony Orchestra
 Vaughan Williams – Symphony No 5 / 2007 BBC Music Magazine CD /  BBC Symphony Orchestra
 Britten – Phaedra and various / 2011 Chandos /  BBC Symphony Orchestra
 Delius – Appalachia / 2011 Chandos /  BBC Symphony Orchestra
 Donizetti – Caterina Cornarno / 2013 Opera Rara /  BBC Symphony Orchestra
 Smetana – The Bartered Bride / 2012 Harmonia Mundi /  BBC Symphony Orchestra
 Lutoslawski – Symphonic Variations / 2012 Chandos /  BBC Symphony Orchestra
 Lutoslawski – Vocal Works / 2011 Chandos /  BBC Symphony Orchestra
 Lutoslawski – Symphony No 3 / 2010 Chandos /  BBC Symphony Orchestra
 Brahms – Schoenberg Piano Quartet / 1991 Collins Classics / London Philharmonic
 Crosse, Bedford / 1997 NMC /  BBC Symphony Orchestra
 Gerhard – Various / 1997 Chandos /  BBC Symphony Orchestra
 Nyman – Trombone Concerto / 1997 EMI /  BBC Symphony Orchestra
 Matthews, Musgrave / 1998 NMC /  BBC Symphony Orchestra
 Tchaikovski, Scriabin / 1993 Hyperion /  BBC Symphony Orchestra
 Dillon – Ignis Noster / Helle Nacht / 1994 Disques Montaigne /  BBC Symphony Orchestra
 Sackman, Hawthorn / 1995 NMC /  BBC Symphony Orchestra
 Martinu – The Epic of Gilgamesh / 1995 BBC Music Magazine CD /  BBC Symphony Orchestra
 Sawer – Byrnan Wood / 1995 NMC /  BBC Symphony Orchestra
 Ruders – Concerto in Pieces / 1995 Dorling Kindersley /  BBC Symphony Orchestra
 Brahms – Symphony No 4 / 1997 BBC Music Magazine CD /  BBC Symphony Orchestra
 Bax – Tintagel / 1997 BBC Music Magazine CD /  BBC Symphony Orchestra
 Mozart – Violin Concertos / 1989 Pony Canyon / London Philharmonic
 Vivaldi – Seasons / 1989 Collins Classics / London Philharmonic
 Mozart – La Clemenza di Tito / 1995 Poorhouse Productions DVD / London Philharmonic
 Furtwangler – Symphony No 2 / 1992 Naxos / BBC Philharmonic

As Soloist 

 Timothy Salter – Parallax / 1996 Usk
 A Life in Reverse – The music of Minna Keal / 1996 Lorelt
 The Golden Age of Hollywood / 2003 BBC Music Magazine CD

References

External links
 
 

Year of birth missing (living people)
Living people
English classical violinists
British male violinists
Alumni of the Royal College of Music
21st-century classical violinists
21st-century British male musicians
Male classical violinists